The Canberra Tennis International is a tournament for professional male and female tennis players played on outdoor hardcourts. The event is classified as a $75,000 ATP Challenger Tour and $60,000 ITF Women's Circuit tournament and has been held in Canberra, Australia, since 2015.

Past finals

Men's singles

Women's singles

Men's doubles

Women's doubles

External links
 ITF search
 Official website

 
ITF Women's World Tennis Tour
ATP Challenger Tour
Hard court tennis tournaments
Tennis tournaments in Australia
Tennis in the Australian Capital Territory
Recurring sporting events established in 2015
Sports competitions in Canberra